Hibbertia sericosepala is a species of flowering plant in the family Dilleniaceae and is endemic to the west of Western Australia. It is an often sprawling shrub with clustered, linear leaves and yellow flowers surrounded by leaf clusters, the flowers with twenty-five to thirty stamens in five bundles around the three carpels.

Description
There are twenty-five to thirty stamens fused in five bundles around the three carpels, each carpel with two ovules. Flowering mainly occurs in September.

Taxonomy
Hibbertia sericosepala was first formally described in 2013 by Kevin Thiele in the journal Nuytsia from specimens collected near Gingin in 2009. The specific epithet (sericosepala) means "silky sepals".

Distribution and habitat
This species mainly grows in the understorey of heathy woodland and has mainly been recorded from the area between Badgingarra and Gnangara in the west of Western Australia.

Conservation status
Hibbertia sericosepala is classified as "not threatened" by the Government of Western Australia Department of Biodiversity, Conservation and Attractions.

See also
List of Hibbertia species

References

sericosepala
Flora of Western Australia
Plants described in 2013
Taxa named by Kevin Thiele